Connare is a surname. Notable people with the surname include:

Vincent Connare (born 1960), Microsoft employee and typographer
William G. Connare (1911–1995), American Roman Catholic prelate

See also
Connard